Lijiang railway station is a railway station in Yulong Naxi Autonomous County, Lijiang, Yunnan, China. It is the northern terminus of the Dali–Lijiang railway and the southern terminus of the currently under construction Lijiang–Shangri-La railway.

History
The railway station opened on 29 October 2011.

References

Railway stations in Yunnan
Railway stations in China opened in 2011